John Yuda Msuri (born June 9, 1979 in Dodoma) is a Tanzanian long-distance runner.

Achievements

2002 World Half Marathon Championships - bronze medal
2002 World Cross Country Championships - silver medal (long race)
2002 Commonwealth Games - bronze medal (10,000 m)
2001 World Half Marathon Championships - bronze medal
2001 East African Championships - gold medal (10,000 m)

External links 
 
 

1979 births
Living people
Tanzanian male long-distance runners
Athletes (track and field) at the 2002 Commonwealth Games
Athletes (track and field) at the 2004 Summer Olympics
Olympic athletes of Tanzania
People from Dodoma
Commonwealth Games bronze medallists for Tanzania
Commonwealth Games medallists in athletics
Medallists at the 2002 Commonwealth Games